Nayabazar  (Nepali: नयाँ बजार) is the name of Ward Number 9 in Pokhara Metropolitan City in Nepal. It refers to a two lane street from Mahendrapul to Prithivi Chowk.

Boundaries of Nayabazar 

 East: Ranipauwa
 West: New Road
 North: Mahendrapul
 South: Prithivi Chowk

References 

Kaski District
Gandaki Province
Wards of Pokhara